Nelson Bentley (1918–1990) was an American poet and professor at the University of Washington in Seattle. He was born in Elm, Michigan. He graduated from the University of Michigan, receiving his bachelor's and then his master's degree from that university.

Bentley studied under W. H. Auden. He was a friend and colleague of Theodore Roethke, among other Northwest poets who created a distinct regional voice. In his forty years as a professor he conducted workshops, hosted readings at literary venues around the city and on radio and public television, juried poetry contests, edited poetry for journals and newspapers, and was a co-founder of Poetry Northwest and The Seattle Review. Although he was an accomplished poet in his own right, those who knew him believed his teaching was more important to him; his wife Beth Singer Bentley said after his death that he "cared more for his students' success than for his own." He founded the Castalia Reading Series, which started at the University of Washington in the mid-seventies and continues today.

Bibliography
 The Flying Oyster: The Collected Comic Apocalypses, Bellowing Ark Press, 1997
 The Collected Shorter Poems, Bellowing Ark Press, 1988
 Snoqualmie Falls Apocalypse, Confluence Press, Lewiston, 1981
 Iron Man of the Hoh, Copper Canyon Press, Port Townsend, 1978
 Moosecall, Jawbone Press, 1977
 A Day at North Cove, Raven's Mask Press, Seattle, 1974
 Grayland Apocalypse, Bonefire Press, Seattle, 1972
 Sea Lion Caves and Other Poems, from "New Poetry Series," Alan Swallow, Denver, 1967

References

1918 births
1990 deaths
Poets from Washington (state)
University of Washington faculty
University of Michigan alumni
20th-century American poets